South Carolina Highway 274 (SC 274) is a  primary state highway in the U.S. state of South Carolina. It connects the cities of Rock Hill and Gastonia, North Carolina. Though it travels generally in a north–south direction, it is signed west–east.

Route description

SC 274 is mostly a four-lane suburban highway that traverses , from the North Carolina state line, where the road continues north as North Carolina Highway 274 (NC 274), to downtown Rock Hill at SC 322.

History

Established in 1937 as a renumbering of SC 58 to match NC 274, it originally traveled from SC 49 to the North Carolina state line. In 1939, it was extended south to SC 5 (now SC 161), traveling concurrently with SC 49. In 1942, the entire route was fully paved. Between 1959 and 1961, SC 274 was extended south again to its current southern terminus on Cherry Road in Rock Hill.

Major intersections

See also

References

External links

SC 274 at Virginia Highways' South Carolina Highways Annex

274
Transportation in York County, South Carolina